The Hundred Guilder Print is an etching by Rembrandt. The etching's popular name derives from the large sum of money supposedly once paid for an example. It is also called Christ healing the sick, Christ with the Sick around Him, Receiving Little Children, or Christ preaching, since the print depicts multiple events from Matthew 19 in the New Testament, including Christ healing the sick, debating with scholars and calling on children to come to him. The rich young man mentioned in the chapter is leaving through the gateway on the right.

Rembrandt worked on the Hundred Guilder Print in stages throughout the 1640s, and it was the "critical work in the middle of his career", from which his final etching style began to emerge. He probably completed it in 1649. Although the print only survives in two states, the first very rare, evidence of much reworking can be seen underneath the final print and many drawings survive for elements of it.

Wieseman describes the etching as a "technical tour de force, incorporating an enormous diversity of printmaking styles and techniques":
The group of figures at the left side of the print, for example, is deftly indicated with a minimum of lightly bitten lines; in contrast, the evocative richness of the blacks and the depth of tone in the right half of the print represents Rembrandt's experimental competition with the newly discovered mezzotint technique.

The Baillie Print
Around 1775, Captain William Baillie printed a 100 impression edition of an extensively re-worked, by his own hand, version of Rembrandt's original copper plate.

He acquired the plate, already worn down by repeated printings, from the painter and engraver John Greenwood. As an engraver himself, Biallie attempted to restore the work, but his effort was considered "hard and unfeeling, lacking all the subtleties of Rembrandt's own work".  After his edition, Baillie cut the plate into four pieces, reworked them further, and had them printed as separate images. To the reduced center fragment with Christ, he added the frame of an arch.

Known locations
While the number of copies printed by Rembrandt and subsequent owners is unknown, the Hundred Guilder Print is not rare by the standards of Rembrandt prints, though the quality of impressions varies considerably. Impressions are in many print rooms, including:
 British Museum
 Frick Collection
 Museum of Fine Arts, Boston including Biallie prints 
 Metropolitan Museum of Art
 Oberlin College, Allen Memorial Art Museum
 Rijksmuseum

References

Prints by Rembrandt
Prints based on the Bible
1640s works